Streptomyces tritolerans is a bacterium species from the genus of Streptomyces which has been isolated from soil in Karnataka in India.

See also 
 List of Streptomyces species

References

Further reading

External links
Type strain of Streptomyces tritolerans at BacDive -  the Bacterial Diversity Metadatabase	

tritolerans
Bacteria described in 2009